Singularity is an experimental operating system developed by Microsoft Research between July 9, 2003, and February 7, 2015. It was designed as a high dependability OS in which the kernel, device drivers, and application software were all written in managed code. Internal security uses type safety instead of hardware memory protection.

Operation 
The lowest-level x86 interrupt dispatch code is written in assembly language and C. Once this code has done its job, it invokes the kernel, which runtime system and garbage collector are written in Sing# (an extended version of Spec#, itself an extension of C#) and runs in unprotected mode. The hardware abstraction layer is written in C++ and runs in protected mode. There is also some C code to handle debugging. The computer's basic input/output system (BIOS) is invoked during the 16-bit real mode bootstrap stage; once in 32-bit mode, Singularity never invokes the BIOS again, but invokes device drivers written in Sing#. During installation, Common Intermediate Language (CIL) opcodes are compiled into x86 opcodes using the Bartok compiler.

Security design 
Singularity is a microkernel operating system. Unlike most historic microkernels, its components execute in the same address space (process), which contains software-isolated processes (SIPs). Each SIP has its own data and code layout, and is independent from other SIPs. These SIPs behave like normal processes, but avoid the cost of task-switches.

Protection in this system is provided by a set of rules called invariants that are verified by static program analysis. For example, in the memory-invariant states there must be no cross-references (or memory pointers) between two SIPs; communication between SIPs occurs via higher-order communication channels managed by the operating system. Invariants are checked during installation of the application. (In Singularity, installation is managed by the operating system.)

Most of the invariants rely on the use of safer memory-managed languages, such as Sing#, which have a garbage collector, allow no arbitrary pointers, and allow code to be verified to meet a given computer security policy.

Project status 
The first Singularity Research Development Kit (RDK), RDK 1.1, was initially released on March 4, 2008, being released under a shared source license allowing academic non-commercial use and available from CodePlex. RDK 2.0 was later released on November 14, 2008.

Similar projects 
 Inferno, first created in 1995, based on Plan 9 from Bell Labs; programs are run in a virtual machine and written in Limbo instead of C# with CIL; open-source software
 JavaOS, a legacy OS based on the same concept as Singularity
 JNode, an OS similar in concept to Singularity, but with Java instead of C# with CIL
 JX, a Java OS that, like Singularity, uses type safety instead of computer hardware memory protection
 Phantom OS, a managed OS
 SharpOS, a former effort to write an operating system using C#; open-source software
 MOSA, a .NET Framework compiler and operating system using C#
 Cosmos, a building blocks toolkit for developing an OS using C#; open-source software
 TempleOS, a ring-0 operating system with JIT compiler; open-source software

See also 
 Language-based system, general kernel design using language-based protection instead of hardware protection.
 Spec#, programming language derived from C# by adding Eiffel-like design by contract.
 Sing#, programming language derived from Spec# by adding channels and low-level constructs; used to build Singularity.
 Midori, a Microsoft-developed microkernel-based operating system. Based on and related to Singularity.

References

External links 
 
 Singularity Design Motivation and an overview of the Singularity Project
 Singularity source code on CodePlex
 Singularity: A research OS written in C# an interview of the Channel 9 team to Jim Larus and Galen Hunt (video & thread)
 Singularity III: Revenge of the SIP, an interview of the Channel 9 team to 3 researchers of the Singularity Project Team (video & thread).
 Singularity IV: Return of the UI, a demo of Singularity actually running (video & thread).
 Singularity Revisited, an interview of the Channel 9 team to 4 researchers of the Singularity Project Team (video & thread)

Microsoft operating systems
Microsoft Research
Microkernel-based operating systems
Microkernels
.NET
Operating system distributions bootable from read-only media